Joseph Jean-Paul "J. P." Lamirande (August 20, 1923 – January 30, 1976) was a Canadian professional ice hockey defenceman who played 49 games in the National Hockey League for the Montreal Canadiens and New York Rangers. He was born in Shawinigan Falls, Quebec.

Lamirande also played for Canada (represented by the 1958 Allan Cup champion Belleville McFarlands) at the 1959 IIHF world championship tournament in Czechosolvakia.  Canada won the event and Lamirande was named the tournament's top defenceman.

External links

1923 births
1976 deaths
Canadian ice hockey defencemen
Clinton Comets players
Ice hockey people from Quebec
Montreal Canadiens players
New Haven Ramblers players
New York Rangers players
Sportspeople from Shawinigan
St. Louis Flyers players
St. Paul Saints (USHL) players
Canadian expatriate ice hockey players in the United States